The 1942 North Dakota Fighting Sioux football team, also known as the Nodaks, was an American football team that represented the University of North Dakota in the North Central Conference (NCC) during the 1942 college football season. In its first year under head coach Red Jarrett, the team compiled a 3–3 record (2–3 against NCC opponents), tied for fifth place out of eight teams in the NCC, and was outscored by a total of 92 to 53.

Schedule

References

North Dakota
North Dakota Fighting Hawks football seasons
North Dakota Fighting Sioux football